Stanisław Wisłocki (July 7, 1921May 31, 1998) was a Polish conductor of classical music who performed and recorded with many internationally renowned orchestras, ensembles and virtuoso musicians and is highly regarded for his interpretations of Beethoven, Mozart, Prokofiev, Rachmaninoff, Schumann and Tchaikovsky.

Early life
Wisłocki was born in Rzeszów, Poland. He began his studies in Lwów [Lviv] under Seweryn Barbag, and continued during the war at the Academy of Music in Timișoara and Bucharest under George Simonis (composition and conducting), Emil Mikhail (piano), and George Enescu. It was during this time that he began his artistic career, performing as a pianist and conductor in Romania.

Career
After returning to Poland in 1945, Wisłocki founded the chamber orchestra "Polish Society for the Promotion of Folk Music". Two years later he started the Poznan Philharmonic Orchestra, where he was artistic director and conductor for 11 years. From 1961 to 1967 he was director of the Warsaw Philharmonic Orchestra, and from 1978-1982 director and artistic director of Symphony Orchestra of Radio and Television in Katowice. During this period he performed in Europe, the United States, Canada, South America and Japan. In 1948 he began teaching, and in 1951 he led classes in conducting at the Academy of Music in Poznań.  In 1955 he became a professor at the National Academy of Music in Warsaw and from 1958 was Head of the Department of Conducting. Among his students were: Tomasz Bugaj, Zbigniew Graca, Jacek Kaspszyk, Simon Kawalla, Wojciech Michniewski, Andrew Straszynski, Ruben Silva, Juan Carlos Nuñez and Henryk Wojnarowski.  A few of the notable soloists that he performed with were: Sviatoslav Richter, Roman Totenberg and Ivry Gitlis.

At the turn of the 1990s he was appointed Music Director of the National Philharmonic Orchestra of Venezuela.

Awards
Stanisław Wisłocki was awarded many prestigious awards, including the Grand Prix du Disque, Académie Charles Cros in Paris (for "Piano Concerto" by Sergey Rachmaninoff with Sviatoslav Richter and the National Philharmonic Orchestra ), the Minister of Culture and Art Prize of the Polish Composers Union and numerous Polish and foreign decorations.

Discography
Extensive AllMusic entry - http://www.allmusic.com/artist/stanislaw-wislocki-q60929/credits/all
Extensive Discogs entry - http://www.discogs.com/artist/Stanislaw+Wislocki

Film work
Trzy kroki po ziemi - 1965
Dziadek do orzechów  - 1967
The Deluge - 1974
The Conductor - 1980
The Polish Bride - 1998

External links

References

1921 births
1998 deaths
Grand Prix du Disque winners
Polish conductors (music)
Male conductors (music)
Academic staff of the Chopin University of Music
People from Rzeszów
20th-century conductors (music)
20th-century male musicians
Polish expatriates in Romania